Bishop Machebeuf High School is an Archdiocesan school under the Roman Catholic Archdiocese of Denver, in Denver, Colorado

Background
Founded in 1958 as "Bishop Machebeuf Catholic High School", it is named after Bishop Joseph Projectus Machebeuf, Denver's first bishop. It is a co-ed college preparatory high school located in Lowry, Colorado.

The Lowry Location 
In January 2000, Bishop Machebeuf High School moved from its historic old location in Denver's Park Hill neighborhood to Lowry. The new location includes a gym, drama room and stage, cafeteria with microwaves for student use, a kitchen, athletic fields, a courtyard in the center of the academic wing, athletic fields, 17 1,100 square foot classrooms, and a center for counseling and academic resources, all things that were not present at the old location.

Classical Track 
In 2017, Bishop Machebeuf added their Classical track which is a class designed to teach students using classic materials such as Plato, Socrates, Aristotle, St. Augustine, etc. The students in this track are part of it for all four years at BMHS.

Campus Ministry
Three Divisions of Campus Ministry
The Campus Ministry program has three major divisions. Each division has a student director that coordinates the particular part of the program with the Campus Minister.

Liturgy
The liturgy division provides liturgical experiences for the entire student body. This primarily refers to the All School Liturgy which happens on a monthly basis. The liturgy division also assists the organization of First Friday Adoration days and monthly confession services.
Finally the liturgy division organizes All School prayer at BMHS including but not limited to: Opening and Closing of the school prayer and special prayer services during the liturgical seasons.

Evangelization
The evangelization division assists the organization of outreach events for the students of BMHS as well as the larger community. Events include: Christian concerts, mission trips, service projects, pilgrimages, and special community masses (St. Nick's mass, Mother – Son Mass etc.).

Media
The media division of Campus Ministry provides support for all aspects of Campus Ministry. The media division produces resources for the web, print, and multimedia presentations. Photos of all CM are collected and stored by the media division. Press and news releases are published by the media division as well.

Athletics

The girls' basketball team won the 3A state championship in 2003 and 2007.

In 2005, Bishop Machebeuf won the boys' baseball state championship in Class 3A, defeating state powerhouse Eaton in the semifinals and Roosevelt in the championship game.

Championship Team Rosters
Baseball - 2005
Tyler Hensen C, Danny Young C, Dominic Paolucci 3B, Jordan Johnson SS/P, Nick Cafasso P/OF, Logan Roberts OF, Greg Schaer P/OF, Daniel Sheley P/OF, Dave Kathmann P/OF, David Machado 1B, Matt McIntyre OF, Josh Cox P/OF, Richie Parkhill SS, Mike Lopez 2B, Devon Tenario OF.

Notes and references

External links
 

Catholic secondary schools in Colorado
High schools in Denver
Educational institutions established in 1958
1958 establishments in Colorado
Roman Catholic Archdiocese of Denver